Nicolás Baeza (born 7 May 1997) is a Chilean footballer who plays for Huachipato.

References

1997 births
Living people
Chilean footballers
Chilean Primera División players
C.D. Huachipato footballers
Association football defenders
People from Talcahuano